Edson Zenteno (born 12 August 1978) is a Bolivian football midfielder.

He is a brother of Edward Zenteno.

References

1978 births
Living people
Sportspeople from Cochabamba
Bolivian footballers
Club Aurora players
The Strongest players
Club Atlético Ciclón players
Guabirá players
Nacional Potosí players
C.D. Jorge Wilstermann players
Universitario de Sucre footballers
Bolivian Primera División players
Association football midfielders